NGC 972 is a dusty spiral galaxy in the northern constellation of Aries, located at an approximate distance of  from the Milky Way. It was discovered in 1784 by William Herschel. The galactic features suggest it may have undergone a merger with a gas-rich companion, giving it asymmetrical arms, plus starburst activity in the nucleus and an off-planar nuclear ring. The inner 3.6 kpc of the galaxy is undergoing star formation at the rate of 2.1–2.7 ·yr−1, but it lacks a nuclear bulge.

It reached magnitude 14.7 in the infrared K' band, but only a possible very faint transient event was observed in the visual frequency range, most likely as a result of strong extinction.

The group of galaxies around NGC 972 is sometimes referred to as the "NGC 972 group," which includes NGC 1012, NGC 1056, UGC 1958, UGC 2017, UGC 2053, and UGC 2221.

References

External links

NGC 972 on SIMBAD

Spiral galaxies
972
Aries (constellation)
009788